Varinthorn Phadoongvithee  is a businesswoman and the 2001 Miss Thailand Universe.

Biography
Varinthorn Phadoongvithee was born and raised in Nonthaburi, Thailand.

Pageantry
Phadoongvithee was crowned second Miss Thailand Universe on March 24, 2001.

After becoming Miss Thailand Universe, she travelled to Bayamón, Puerto Rico to compete in the Miss Universe 2001 pageant, held at the Coliseo Rubén Rodríguez on May 11, 2001, but did not place.  Miss Puerto Rico, Denise Quiñones was crowned Miss Universe 2001.

Discography

Television dramas
 2003 Dao Lhong Fah Phupaa See Ngern (ดาวหลงฟ้า ภูผาสีเงิน) (Kantana Group/Ch.7) as (Cameo) (รับเชิญ)   
 2003 Benja Keta Kwarm Ruk (เบญจา คีตา ความรัก) (DARA VDO/Ch.7) as (อาจารย์)

Television series
 20  (/Ch.) as 

Television sitcom
 20  (/Ch.) as 

External links
Crowning Moment
Sawasdee Pageant The Majestic World of Beauty Pageant

1977 births
Living people
Miss Universe 2001 contestants
Varinthorn Phadoongvithee
Varinthorn Phadoongvithee
Varinthorn Phadoongvithee
Varinthorn Phadoongvithee
Varinthorn Phadoongvithee